Dominique Caillaud (born 20 May 1946, in L'Herbergement, Vendée) is a member of the National Assembly of France.  He represents the Vendée department,  and is a member of the Union for a Popular Movement.

References

1946 births
Living people
People from Vendée
Politicians from Pays de la Loire
Centre of Social Democrats politicians
Union for French Democracy politicians
Union for a Popular Movement politicians
Deputies of the 11th National Assembly of the French Fifth Republic
Deputies of the 12th National Assembly of the French Fifth Republic
Deputies of the 13th National Assembly of the French Fifth Republic